Hünern may refer to the former German name of the following villages in Poland:
Psary, Oława County
Psary, Trzebnica County